The Foreign Minister of Bolivia (Spanish Ministro de Relaciones Exteriores or informally Canciller) is the head of the Ministry of Foreign Affairs. The current minister is Rogelio Mayta, who was appointed by president Luis Arce in November 2020.

List of ministers 
This is a list of foreign ministers of Bolivia:

1826–1828: Facundo Jacinto Infante
1828: José Joaquín Casimiro Olañeta Guemes
1828: José Severo Feliciano Malavia
1829: Mariano del Callejo
1829: José María de Lara
1829–1831: Mariano Enrique Calvo
1831: Manuel José de Asin Franco
1832–1833: José Joaquín Casimiro Olañeta Guemes
1833–1835: Mariano Enrique Calvo
1835–1837: José Ignacio Sanjinés
1837–1838: Andrés María Torrico Camacho
1838–1839: José Joaquín Casimiro Olañeta Guemes
1839: Manuel María Urcullu
1839–1841: José María Linares
1841: José María Calvimontes
1841–1842: Manuel María Urcullu
1842–1844: Manuel de la Cruz Méndez
1844–1847: Tomás Frías Ametller
1847–1848: Domingo Delgadillo
1848: José Joaquín Casimiro Olañeta Guemes
1848–1849: Juan Ramón Muñoz y Cabrera
1849: Lucas Mendoza de la Tapia
1849: Manuel José de Asin Franco
1849–1851: Tomas Baldivieso
1851–1852: Juan Crisóstomo Unzueta
1852–1854: Mariano Rafael Bustillo Montesinos
1854–1857: Juan de la Cruz Benavente
1857–1861: Lucas Mendoza de la Tapia
1861: Ricardo José Bustamante
1861: Mariano Rafael Bustillo Montesinos
1861–1862: Manuel Macedonio Salinas
1862: Lucas Mendoza de la Tapia
1862–1863: Juan de la Cruz Benavente
1863–1864: Mariano Rafael Bustillo Montesinos
1864–1871: Mariano Donato Muñoz
1871–1873: Casimiro Corral
1873: Melchor Terrazas Virreira
1873–1876: Mariano Baptista
1876–1877: Jorge Oblitas
1877–1878: José Manuel del Carpio
1878: Luciano Valle
1878–1879: Martín Lanza Saravia
1879: Serapio Reyes Ortiz
1880: Juan Crisóstomo Carrillo
1880–1881: Belisario Boeto
1881: Daniel Nuñez del Prado
1881–1882: Pedro José Zilveti
1882–1884: Antonio Quijarro Quevedo
1884: Pedro Hermenegildo Vargas
1884: Nataniel Aguirre Gonzales
1884–1885: Jorge Oblitas
1885: Macedonio Doria Medina
1885: Heriberto Gutiérrez
1885–1887: Juan Crisóstomo Carrillo
1887–1888: Juan Francisco Velarde
1888–1891: Mariano Baptista
1891: Serapio Reyes Ortiz
1891–1892: José Manuel del Carpio
1892: Severo Fernández
1892–1896: Emeterio Cano y Benavente
1896–1899: Manuel María Gómez
1899–1900: Fernando Eloy Guachalla
1900: Eliodoro Villazón
1900: Demetrio Calvimonte
1900–1902: Federico Díez de Medina
1902–1903: Eliodoro Villazón
1903–1908: Claudio Pinilla
1908–1909: Benedicto Gómez Goytia y Rodo
1909–1910: Daniel Sánchez Bustamante Vásquez
1910–1911: José María Escalier
1911: Juan Misael Saracho
1911–1912: Claudio Pinilla
1912–1913: Juan Misael Saracho
1913: Alfredo Ascarrunz Peláez
1913–1914: José Cupertino Arteaga
1914–1915: Juan Misael Saracho
1915: Plácido Sánchez
1915–1916: Víctor Enrique Sanjinés Eguino
1916–1917: Plácido Sánchez
1917: Julio Zamora
1917: Ricardo Mujía Linares
1917–1919: Alberto Gutiérrez
1919: Darío Gutiérrez
1919–1920: Carlos Gutiérrez
1920–1921: José María Escalier
1921: Francisco Iraizos
1921–1922: Alberto Gutiérrez
1922: Ricardo Jaimes Freyre
1922: Abdón Saavedra
1922: Severo Fernández
1922–1923: David Alvéstegui Laredo
1923: Eduardo Díez de Medina
1923–1925: Román Paz
1925–1926: Eduardo Díez de Medina
1926–1927: Alberto Gutiérrez
1927–1928: Tomás Manuel Elío Bustillos
1928: Abel Iturralde Palacios
1928–1929: Tomás Manuel Elío Bustillos
1929: Francisco Iraizos
1929–1930: Fabian Vaca Chávez
1930: Rafael Torrico Lemoine
1930: Alberto Diez de Medina Lertora
1930–1931: Filiberto R. Osorio Téllez
1931: Daniel Sánchez Bustamante Vásquez
1931: Pascual Bailón Mercado
1931–1932: Julio A. Gutiérrez
1932: Juan María Zalles Calderón
1932: Julio A. Gutiérrez
1932–1933: Franz Tamayo
1933: Demetrio Canelas
1933–1934: Carlos Calvo Calbimontes
1934–1935: David Alvéstegui Laredo
1935: Carlos Víctor Aramayo
1935: Tomás Manuel Elío Bustillos
1935: Manuel Carrasco Jiménez
1935–1936: José María Gutiérrez Lea Plaza
1936: Tomás Manuel Elío Bustillos
1936: Luis Fernando Guachalla Solares
1936: Enrique Baldivieso
1936: Óscar Moscoso Gutiérrez
1936–1937: Enrique Finot
1937: Enrique Baldivieso
1937–1939: Eduardo Díez de Medina
1939–1941: Alberto Ostria Gutiérrez
1941–1942: Eduardo Anze Matienzo
1942–1943: Tomás Manuel Elío Bustillos
1943: Carlos Salinas Aramayo
1943–1944: José Tamayo Solares
1944: Enrique Baldivieso
1944: Víctor Andrade Uzquiano
1944–1945: Gustavo Chacón
1945–1946: José Celestino Pinto López
1946: Jorge Calero
1946: Aniceto Solares Llano
1946: Eduardo Sáenz García
1946–1947: Aniceto Solares Llano
1947: Mamerto Urriolagoitía
1947: Luis Fernando Guachalla Solares
1947–1948: Tomás Manuel Elío Bustillos
1948: Adolfo Costa du Rels
1948–1949: Javier Paz Campero
1949: Juan Manuel Balcázar
1949: Luis Fernando Guachalla Solares
1949: Waldo Belmonte Pool
1949–1950: Alberto Saavedra Nogales
1950–1951: Pedro Zilveti Arce
1951–1952: Tomás Antonio Suárez Castedo
1952–1956: Wálter Guevara
1956–1958: Manuel Barraú Peláez
1958–1959: Víctor Andrade Uzquiano
1959–1960: Wálter Guevara
1960: Carlos Morales Guillén
1960–1962: Eduardo Arze Quiroga
1962–1964: José Fellmann Velarde
1964: Fernando Iturralde Chinel
1964–1966: Joaquín Zenteno Anaya
1966–1967: Alberto Crespo Gutiérrez
1967–1968: Wálter Guevara
1968: Samuel Alcoreza Meneses
1968–1969: Víctor Hoz de Vila Bacarreza
1969: Gustavo Medeiros Querejazú
1969–1970: César Ruiz Velarde
1970: Edgar Camacho Omiste
1970–1971: Emilio Molina Pizarro
1971: Huáscar Taborga Torrico
1971–1973: Mario R. Gutiérrez Gutiérrez
1973–1976: Alberto Guzmán Soriano
1976–1978: Óscar Adriázola Valda
1978: Ricardo Anaya Arze
1978–1979: Raúl Botelho Gosálvez
1979: Jorge Escobari Cusicanqui
1979: Gustavo Fernández Saavedra
1979: Guillermo Bedregal Gutiérrez
1979–1980: Julio Garrett Ayllón
1980: Gastón Araoz Levy
1980–1981: Javier Cerruto Calderón de la Barca
1981: Mario Rolón Anaya
1981–1982: Gonzalo Romero Álvarez García
1982: Agustín Saavedra Weise
1982–1983: Mario Velarde Dorado
1983: Marcial Tamayo Sáenz
1983–1984: José Ortiz Mercado
1984–1985: Gustavo Fernández Saavedra
1985: Edgar Camacho Omiste
1985: Antonio Sánchez (acting)
1985–1986: Gastón Araoz Levy
1986–1989: Guillermo Bedregal Gutiérrez
1989: Valentín Abecia Baldivieso
1989–1992: Carlos Iturralde Ballivián
1992–1993: Ronald MacLean Abaroa
1993: Roberto Peña Rodríguez
1993–1997: Antonio Araníbar Quiroga
1997–2001: Javier Murillo de la Rocha
2001–2002: Gustavo Fernández Saavedra
2002–2003: Carlos Saavedra Bruno
2003–2005: Juan Ignacio Siles
2005–2006: Armando Loaiza
2006–2017: David Choquehuanca
2017–2018: Fernando Huanacuni Mamani
2018–2019: Diego Pary Rodríguez
2019–2020: Karen Longaric
2020–present: Rogelio Mayta

References

External links 
  Ministry of Foreign Affairs

Foreign relations of Bolivia
Foreign ministers of Bolivia